Lacandonia schismatica is a species of mycoheterotrophic plant in the Triuridaceae (although some taxonomists place the genus in a separate family; the Lacandonaceae.). It is endemic to Lacandon Jungle in the State of Chiapas in southern Mexico. It is known from very few populations and is considered endangered by the researchers who investigate this species. It, and its recently discovered relation Lacandonia braziliana, are the only known flowering plants which in its natural population has a spatial inversion of the reproductive floral whorls (ie stamens and carpels): the 2 to 4 stamens are positioned centrally within the flower, and the 60 to 80 carpels arranged in a ring around them.   Perhaps even more remarkable than the reversed positions of male and female parts is the unique mode of pollination.  The pollen grain never leaves the anther, but sends the pollen tube backwards through the length of the stamen, across the receptacle and then into the pistil from below.

It grows in shady sites within this rainforest. Gerrit Davidse and Esteban Martínez noted in 1990 how the plants are "extremely localized and highly endangered" due to encroaching habitat conversion to cattle pasture. They also explain that the species is difficult to cultivate and therefore they encourage other scientists to study this unique organism's biology before it can no longer be found in the wild.

References

Flora of Chiapas
Parasitic plants
Plants described in 1989
Triuridaceae